Jaume Collboni Cuadrado (Barcelona, Catalonia, Spain 1969) is a Spanish politician, lawyer by profession and civil servant of the local administration. He is Deputy Mayor of Barcelona since July 2019.

In 2010 he became a member of the Parliament of Catalonia, representing the province of Barcelona,  and was appointed deputy spokesman in the Parliamentary Group of the Socialists. In November 2011 he was appointed Secretary of Communication and Spokesman of the PSC. Later, in 2014, he left his seat to run in the primary of the PSC for the mayoralty of Barcelona. Following these primaries, which he won, was designated candidate for Mayor of Barcelona by the Party of the Socialists of Catalonia.

Biography 
Born in Barcelona in the year 1969, in the Baix Guinardó, Collboni also lived in the neighbourhoods of la Teixonera, the Gothic Quarter, El Poblenou and the district of the Eixample. His familial origins, as with many Catalans, are diverse. His grandparents and maternal uncles descend from the first wave of migration from Andalusia at the beginning of the 20th century.

Trade union path 
He commenced his syndical activism in the assembly movement and, upon entering the Faculty of Law at the University of Barcelona, joined  the Association of Young Students of Catalonia (AJEC) of which he ended up as general secretary from 1992 to 1995, a period in which he was a cloistral member of the University of Barcelona under the mandate of the rector, Dr. Bricall.
In 1996, he promoted the creation of the Technical Cabinet of the UGT (General Workers' Union) of Catalonia, of which he formed part of the National Management of the union from 1998 to 2005, developing tasks in the fields of communication, culture, international relations and cooperation. During the same period, he was one of the founders of the Centre for Economic and Social Research of Catalonia (CRESC). Between 2001 and 2005, he was a councillor for trade union representation of the Economic and Social Council of Spain.

Political trajectory 
Jaume Collboni joined the Party of the Socialists of Catalonia in the year 1994. Two years later he was chosen spokesman of the district of Horta-Guinardó, a position he held until 1999. Between the years 2005 and 2010, he assumed the coordination of the Socialist Parliamentary Group in the Parliament of Catalonia. Since 2008 he has also belonged to the party executive. In December 2011, during the Twelfth Congress of the PSC, he was appointed Secretary of Communication and Spokesman for the party. In 2010 he was director of the election campaign of the PSC for the regional elections and, from this same year, he was a member of the Parliament of Catalonia and deputy spokesman for the parliamentary group of the socialists and spokesperson for the Committee on Business and Employment. He was chairman of the committee on the electoral law of Catalonia, and in turn, of the committee for the law on transparency and access to public information.

In 2014 he stood as a candidate in the primary, organised by the PSC, to be chosen as mayoral candidate for the city of Barcelona. He competed against fellow party members Carmen Andrés, Jordi Martí, Laia Bonet and Rocío Martínez-Sampere. Taking place in Ciudad Condal on 29 March 2014, the primary saw a first round in which Collboni and Andrés were the most voted candidates, who subsequently went forward to a run-off. In both rounds, Jaume Collboni was the most voted candidate.

Political and institutional charges 
 1998 - 2005 Member of the National Executive Council of the UGT
 2001- 2005 Councillor for trade union representation at the Economic and Social Council of Spain
 1999 - 2003 PSC Spokesman in the District of Horta-Guinardó
 2005 - 2010 Coordinator of the parliamentary group of the socialists in the Parliament of Catalonia
 2008 - Member of the executive of the PSC
 2010 - Member of the Parliament of Catalonia and deputy spokesman of the Parliamentary Group
 2011 - Secretary of Communication and spokesman for the PSC
 2012 - Spokesman of the Socialist Group in the Parliament of Catalonia
 2014 - President of the Barcelona Federation of the PSC.
 2015 - Member of Barcelona City Council.

References 

1969 births
Gay politicians
LGBT legislators in Spain
Barcelona municipal councillors (2015–2019)
Socialists' Party of Catalonia politicians
Living people
Barcelona municipal councillors (2019–2023)
Members of the 9th Parliament of Catalonia
Members of the 10th Parliament of Catalonia